Grazielle Pinheiro Nascimento (born 28 March 1981), commonly known as Grazielle or Grazi,  is a Brazilian professional footballer who plays as a right winger for Corinthians. She was part of the Brazil women's national football team at two Olympic soccer tournaments and at three editions of the FIFA Women's World Cup.

Club career
In 1995, Grazielle moved to São Paulo and over the following five years represented the women's sections of local clubs Saad Esporte Clube, São Paulo FC and Portuguesa. She was without a professional club from 2000 until 2003, when she joined Botucatu.

Grazielle returned to Botucatu after spending six months in Spain with Levante during 2006. She also played for Santa Isabel (MG), Barra FC (RJ) and SE Gama (DF) before joining Santos in 2010. She represented América FC of São Manuel before the 2012 London Olympics. The club wanted her to return after the tournament, but Grazielle agreed a contract with Portuguesa instead.

At the 2015 Copa do Brasil de Futebol Feminino, Grazielle played for Abelhas Rainhas, who were eliminated in the round of 16 by eventual winners Kindermann. She signed for Corinthians in 2016.

International career

Grazielle made her debut for Brazil in an 11–0 win over Mexico at the 1998 Women's U.S. Cup. In February 1999, 17-year-old Grazielle stood in for the injured Roseli de Belo as Brazil's representative in a FIFA World Star team to play a showpiece friendly against the United States in San Jose. She was then part of the Brazilian roster which reached the semi-finals of the 1999 FIFA Women's World Cup.

After drifting out of contention, Grazielle was recalled ahead of the 2004 Athens Olympics. She was successfully converted from a forward to an attacking right wing-back and helped Brazil win silver medals.

Notes

References

External links
 
 Santos player profile 
 

1981 births
Living people
Brazilian women's footballers
Women's association football midfielders
Footballers at the 2011 Pan American Games
2011 FIFA Women's World Cup players
Olympic medalists in football
Olympic footballers of Brazil
Footballers at the 2004 Summer Olympics
Footballers at the 2012 Summer Olympics
Santos FC (women) players
Medalists at the 2004 Summer Olympics
Primera División (women) players
Levante UD Femenino players
Brazil women's international footballers
Brazilian expatriate women's footballers
Expatriate women's footballers in Spain
Brazilian expatriate sportspeople in Spain
Olympic silver medalists for Brazil
Pan American Games gold medalists for Brazil
Pan American Games silver medalists for Brazil
Pan American Games medalists in football
Sport Club Corinthians Paulista (women) players
2007 FIFA Women's World Cup players
Botucatu Futebol Clube players
1999 FIFA Women's World Cup players
Medalists at the 2011 Pan American Games
São Paulo FC (women) players
Footballers from Brasília
Saad Esporte Clube (women) players
Associação Desportiva Centro Olímpico players